Grandslam Interactive Ltd. (formerly Grandslam Entertainments Ltd. and later Grandslam Video Ltd.) was a video games software house based in Britain. It was formed in late 1987 from a management buy-out of Argus Press Software by former Argus Managing Director, Stephen Hall and close friend David C. Dudman. Grandslam developed and published many games for home computers during the 1980s and 1990s. Originally based in central London, the offices were relocated to Croydon in 1990.

List of games
1987
Terramex

1988
Chubby Gristle
Espionage
City Survivor
The Flintstones
Pac-Land
Pac-Mania
Peter Beardsley's International Football
Alternate Reality: The City

1989
The Running Man
Saint & Greavsie
Thunderbirds
The Seven Gates of Jambala
Warp
Terry's Big Adventure
Trivia - The Ultimate Quest
Chambers of Shaolin

1990
The Hunt for Red October
Scramble Spirits
Space Harrier II
Leavin Teramis
Dragonflight

1991
Die Hard 2: Die Harder
England Championship Special

1992
Nick Faldo's Championship Golf
Stone Age

1993
Liverpool: The Computer Game
Beastlord
Armaeth: The Lost Kingdom 
Legend of Myra

1994
Bump 'N' Burn
Nick Faldo's Championship Golf
Reunion
Beavers
ITS Cricket: International Test Series

1995
Base Jumpers
ITS Cricket: International Test Series

Unpublished
Seven Swords of Mendor
Fighting Survivor

References

External links
Grandslam Interactive Ltd. at MobyGames

Defunct video game companies of the United Kingdom
Video game companies established in 1987